Sir Paul Roderick Clucas Marshall (born 2 August 1959) is a British investor.

According to the Sunday Times Rich List in 2020, Marshall is worth £630 million.

Early life
Paul Roderick Clucas Marshall was born on 2 August 1959 in Ealing, London, England, the son of Alan Marshall, managing director, Philippine Refining Company (later Unilever Philippines), and Mary Sylvia Clucas, daughter of T. S. Hanlin. His sister is the journalist Penny Marshall.

When his parents moved to the Philippines and then South Africa for his father's job with Unilever, Marshall boarded at Merchant Taylors' School, in England. He boarded in the Manor of the Rose while at the school.

From there he went to St John's College, Oxford, to read History and Modern Languages, and subsequently took an MBA from INSEAD business school in Fontainebleau, France.

Career 
He is the co-founder and chairman of Marshall Wace LLP, one of Europe's largest hedge fund groups. Marshall Wace was founded in 1997 by Marshall and Ian Wace. At the time, Marshall Wace was one of the first hedge funds in London. The company started with $50 million, half of which was from George Soros.

Funds managed by Marshall Wace have won multiple investment awards and the company has become one of the world's leading managers of equity long/short strategies. Marshall Wace manages $50 billion and has recently opened an office in China. Prior to founding Marshall Wace, Marshall worked for Mercury Asset Management, the fund management arm of S. G. Warburg & Co.

He is a member of the Hedge Fund Standards Board.

Political affiliations

Marshall had a longstanding involvement with Britain's Liberal Democrats party. He was research assistant to Charles Kennedy, former leader of the Liberal Democrats in 1985 and stood for Parliament for the SDP–Liberal Alliance in Fulham in 1987. He has made appearances on current affairs programmes such as BBC Radio 4's Any Questions.

In 2004, Marshall co-edited The Orange Book with David Laws. Chapters were written by various upcoming Liberal Democrat politicians including Nick Clegg, Chris Huhne, Vince Cable, Ed Davey and Susan Kramer (neither Clegg, Huhne nor Kramer were MPs at the time). Laws, describing the pair's ambition in publishing The Orange Book, wrote "We were proud of the liberal philosophical heritage of our party. But we both felt that this philosophical grounding was in danger of being neglected in favour of no more than 'a philosophy of good intentions, bobbing about unanchored in the muddled middle of British politics'" The book attracted initial controversy when launched, but both it and the term Orange Bookers to describe those sympathetic to its outlook continue to be frequently referenced to describe a strand of thought within the Liberal Democrats.

Between 2002 and 2015, Marshall donated £200,000 to the Liberal Democrats. He left the party in 2015 over its policies on the European Union and its support of continuing British membership.

In July 2016, Marshall donated £3,250 to Michael Gove's Conservative Party leadership campaign.

In 2017, Marshall gave funding to the political news website UnHerd.

In 2019, Marshall gave £500,000 to the Conservative Party.

In 2020/2021 Marshall invested, in a personal capacity, £10 million into the political news and opinion channel GB News. Marshall temporarily replaced Andrew Neil as chairman of the channel following Neil's resignation in September 2021. On 25 April 2022 Marshall was succeeded by Alan McCormick.

2016 EU referendum campaign 
Marshall was a public supporter of Brexit during the European Union membership referendum in 2016. He gave a donation of £100,000 to the Leave campaign.

Writing for BrexitCentral in April 2017 on the UK exiting the European Union, Marshall wrote: "This is a huge opportunity for the UK. Our ambition is that the UK should be a champion of free trade, open and outward looking to the world and built on strong institutions."

In an interview with the Financial Times in 2017, Marshall said: "Most people in Britain do not want to become part of a very large country called Europe. They want to be part of a country called Britain."

Philanthropy

Marshall was the founder, and chairs the board of trustees of the independent research institute the Education Policy Institute (EPI). For over a decade he was also chairman of the EPI's previous incarnation, think tank CentreForum.

He is a founder trustee of ARK and chairman of ARK Schools, which is one of Britain’s leading providers of academies and has also played a pioneering role in developing new programmes for inner city education. Other initiatives spun out of ARK include Future Leaders, Teaching Leaders, Maths Mastery, English Mastery, Science Mastery, Frontline and Now Teach. He is also a founding trustee of the charity Every Child a Chance.

He was appointed lead non-executive director at the Department of Education in 2013.

In April 2015, it was announced that Marshall would donate £30 million to the London School of Economics to establish The Marshall Institute for Philanthropy and Social Entrepreneurship, alongside Sir Thomas Hughes-Hallett. The institute was launched in 2015, with a core aim "to improve the impact and effectiveness of private contributions to the public good".

Marshall was knighted in the 2016 Birthday Honours for services to education and philanthropy.

According to the Sunday Times Giving List in 2020, Marshall donated £106.8 million to charitable causes in 2019.

Publications
Marshall has written widely about education. In 2012, he edited a book on improving the education system called The Tail: how England's schools fail one child in five – and what can be done. Contributors included Labour MP Frank Field, Professor Chris Husbands of the Institute of Education and Stephen Machin of the London School of Economics. He is also co-author of Aiming Higher: a better future for England's schools with Jennifer Moses (2006), and author of Tackling Educational Inequality (with Sumi Rabindrakumar and Lucy Wilkins, 2007).

Marshall's other publications include: The Market Failures Review (Editor – 1999), Britain After Blair (co-editor with Julian Astle, David Laws, Alasdair Murray) and Football and the Big Society (with Sam Tomlin, 2011).

In 2020 he published 10½ Lessons from Experience: Perspectives on Fund Management, a personal reflection on lessons learned from a career in fund management. The Times described the book as "a bit of a gem" and a Bloomberg review welcomed its examination of cognitive bias, the use of data and systematic strategies by successful fund managers. Marshall wrote, "Machines have not won yet. Machines typically do not fare well in a crisis. They are not good at responding to a new paradigm until the rules of the new paradigm are plugged into them by a human."

Personal life
He is married to Sabina. His wife is French and owns an antique shop on the King's Road in Chelsea. Marshall is father of former Mumford & Sons band member Winston Marshall and musician Giovanna Marshall. He was father-in-law to the actress and dancer Dianna Agron for the duration of her marriage to Winston.

In April 2017, he told the Financial Times in an interview that he had no intention of retiring.

References

1959 births
Living people
Alumni of St John's College, Oxford
British company founders
British Eurosceptics
British hedge fund managers
British philanthropists
INSEAD alumni
Knights Bachelor
Social Democratic Party (UK) parliamentary candidates
Liberal Democrats (UK) people
Conservative Party (UK) donors
People educated at Merchant Taylors' School, Northwood
Place of birth missing (living people)